The Wanglee House is a historic building in the Thai capital Bangkok. It sits on the west bank of the Chao Phraya River, in Khlong San District. The house was built in 1881 for Tan Siew-Wang, an influential Chinese-Thai businessman and founder of the Wanglee family. A modified Chinese courtyard house with two storeys and a U-shaped plan, its style is based on the family home of the Poshyananda family, to which Tan's wife belonged. The house received the ASA Architectural Conservation Award in 1984.

See also
 So Heng Tai Mansion, a Chinese courtyard house in Samphanthawong District

References

Buildings and structures in Bangkok
Chinese architecture in Thailand
Unregistered ancient monuments in Bangkok
Buildings and structures on the Chao Phraya River
1880s architecture